Ursula Holden-Gill is an English Actress and Dramatherapist, best known for her roles as school secretary Carol on Channel 4's comedy drama Teachers (2001–2004), Alice Dingle on ITV's soap opera Emmerdale (2004–2006) and Miss Fitzgerald on CBBC's Wolfblood (2012–2014).

Career
Holden-Gill graduated from St Martin's College, Lancaster in 1996 with a BA Honours in Drama and Music, before attaining an MA in Intercultural Storytelling at University of Lancaster and a PG Dip in Acting from the Drama Studio London. Alongside Holden-Gill's theatre and radio credits, her screen credits include The Bill, Sex, Chips & Rock n' Roll, Mrs Merton and Malcolm, Trial and Retribution, Doctor Willoughby, The Wyvern Mystery, People Like Us, Teachers, Emmerdale, The Syndicate, Vera, In the Dark and Wolfblood.

In 2007, Holden-Gill underwent teacher training at Unity College, Burnley, where she attained full qualified Teacher status and went on to establish herself as a professional Storyteller. In 2018, Holden-Gill qualified to practice as a Celebrant with The Order of Bards, Ovates and Druids, and more recently, graduated from Derby University with an MA in Dramatherapy. She lives in West Yorkshire and currently works as a Dramatherapist, Sometime Storyteller – Sunday Celebrant.

Awards and nominations
Nominated – National Television Awards 2006 – Most Popular Actress For Emmerdale (Shortlisted)
Nominated – British Soap Awards 2006 – Best Dramatic Performance For Emmerdale (Shortlisted)
Won – TV Quick Awards 2006 – Best Soap Actress For Emmerdale
Won – Best Newcomer at the British Awards for Storytelling Excellence in 2012

References

External links
 
 

Academics of the University of Salford
Alumni of Lancaster University
Alumni of Graduate College, Lancaster
Alumni of the Drama Studio London
Alumni of the London Academy of Music and Dramatic Art
English television actresses
Living people
Year of birth missing (living people)